Joan Louise Lind (later, Joan Van Blom; September 26, 1952 – August 28, 2015) was an American rower.

Olympian
She competed for United States in the 1976 Summer Olympics, held in Montreal, Quebec, Canada, in the Single sculls event where she finished in the silver medal position. Lind qualified for the 1980 U.S. Olympic team but did not compete due to the U.S. Olympic Committee's boycott of the 1980 Summer Olympics in Moscow, Russia. She was one of 461 athletes to receive a Congressional Gold Medal many years later. She returned to the 1984 Summer Olympics in Los Angeles as part of the American quadruple sculls with Anne Marden, Lisa Rohde, Virginia Gilder and Kelly Rickon, where she picked up a second silver medal.

Honors
Joan (Lind) Van Blom was declared a lifetime member of the Long Beach Rowing Association. She was a member of the Wilson High School Hall of Fame, the Long Beach State 49er Hall of Fame Century Club and the National Rowing Hall of Fame. Legislation was introduced to name a bridge in Long Beach, California in her honor.

Personal
Joan Lind was married to John Van Blom, a sculler, who competed at the 1968, 1972, and 1976 Olympics. John also qualified for the 1980 Olympic rowing team and received a Congressional Medal.

References

External links
 

1952 births
2015 deaths
American female rowers
Rowers at the 1976 Summer Olympics
Rowers at the 1984 Summer Olympics
Medalists at the 1976 Summer Olympics
Medalists at the 1984 Summer Olympics
Olympic silver medalists for the United States in rowing
Sportspeople from Long Beach, California
Place of death missing
Deaths from brain tumor
Congressional Gold Medal recipients
21st-century American women